The 1984 United States Senate election in Michigan was held on November 6, 1984. Incumbent Democratic U.S. Senator Carl Levin won re-election to a second term, defeating Republican candidate and former astronaut Jack Lousma. Coinciding with Republican Ronald Reagan's landslide in Michigan and the rest of the country, this was the only Senate election of Levin's career in which his percentage of the vote and margin of victory decreased from the previous one.

General election

Candidates
 Max Dean (Independent)
 Lynn Johnston (Libertarian)
 Carl Levin, incumbent Senator (Democratic)
 Jack Lousma, astronaut (Republican)
 Fred Mazelis (Workers' League)
 Helen Meyers (Socialist)
 William Roundtree (Workers' World)
 Arthur Richard Tisch (Tisch Citizens)
 Samuel L. Webb (Communist)

Results

See also 
  1984 United States Senate elections

References

Michigan
1984
1984 Michigan elections